Bal'a is a Palestinian town in the Tulkarm Governorate, located approximately nine kilometers northeast of Tulkarm in the northern West Bank and three kilometers away from the highway connecting Tulkarm with Nablus.

According to the Palestinian Central Bureau of Statistics (PCBS), the town had a population of approximately 6,604 in 2007.  In 1922, the town had a population of 1,259 nearly doubled to 2,220 in 1945. After Israel's occupation of the town in 1967 after the Six-Day War, Bal'a inhabitants numbered 3,800 after dozens of families from nearby towns such as, Deir al-Ghusun settled there after being expelled.

History
A tomb was broken into near this village about the time of the SWP visit. It consisted of a single chamber with a loculus on each of three walls. The door was an inscribed slab, with rough  ornamentation. Mr. Tyrwhitt Drake found a date, corresponding to  332 C.E.

Ottoman era
Bal'a, like all of Palestine was incorporated into the Ottoman Empire in 1517.  In the 1596  tax registers,  it was part of the nahiya ("subdistrict") of Jabal Sami, part of the larger Sanjak of Nablus. It had a population of 6 households, all Muslims. The inhabitants paid a fixed tax rate of 33,3% on agricultural products, including wheat, barley, summer crops, olive trees,  goats and beehives, in addition to occasional revenues; a total of 1,658  akçe. Ceramics from the Ottoman era have been found here.

In 1838 it was noted as a  village, Bel'ah,  in the western Esh-Sha'rawiyeh administrative region, north of Nablus.

In 1882, the PEF's Survey of Western Palestine  (SWP)  described Bal'a as “A good-sized village on very high ground, with magnificent groves of olives to the west, and supplied by cisterns. It is apparently an ancient site, having rock-cut tombs.”

British Mandate era
In the 1922 census of Palestine conducted by the British Mandate authorities, its population was 1,259, all Muslims, increasing in  the 1931 census  to 1,539 residents, still all Muslim, in a total of 344 houses.

Jordanian era
In the wake of the 1948 Arab–Israeli War, and after the 1949 Armistice Agreements, Bal'a  came under Jordanian rule.

In 1961, the population of Bal'a was  2,888.

Post-1967
After the Six-Day War in 1967, Bal'a  has been under Israeli occupation.

Demographics
The town's growth stunted after the Six-Day War, going from 3,400 in 1967 to just 3,800 in 1987.

In the first Palestinian census by the Palestinian Central Bureau of Statistics (PCBS) in 1997, Bal'a had a population of 5,444 inhabitants. More than 20% of the residents were Palestinian refugees. The gender make-up was 49.1% male and 50.9% female. In 2007, Bal'a's residents numbered 6,604.

Economy
Bal'a's primary source of income is agriculture. The town's land area consists of about 23,000 dunams most of which is arable land. The town annually produces an average 10,000 tons of olive oil with olives being the main cash crop of Bal'a and surrounding towns and villages. Other common orchards include figs, apricots and almonds. Wheat and barley are grown during the winter while tomatoes, marrows and green peppers are grown mostly during the summer. Livestock is a major factor in Bal'a's agriculture sector as many families own thousands of hens as well as sheep, goats and cattle.

A few hundred in the town work for the Palestinian National Authority (PNA) in careers as teachers, doctors and business managers. A large number of people are in service with various PNA security branches, including the Preventive Security Service. The town's built-up area is currently about 3,600 dunams. Bal'a has six schools: Two secondary, four primary. Boys and girls attend different schools. There are also three kindergartens.

Notable people from Bal'a
Hakam Balawi - Top aide of Yasser Arafat, former PLO ambassador to Algeria and Tunisia and the Interior Minister of the Palestinian National Authority in 2003.

References

Bibliography

External links
 Welcome To Bal'a
Bal’a, Welcome to Palestine
Survey of Western Palestine, Map 11:    IAA, Wikimedia commons

Tulkarm Governorate
Towns in the West Bank
Municipalities of the State of Palestine